Arte Laguna Prize is an international art and design competition which takes place in Venice (Italy) since 2006 and it is aimed at promoting and enhancing contemporary art. There are different contest sections: painting, sculpture and installation, photographic art, video art, performance, virtual art, digital graphics, land art, urban art and design. The competition is based in Venice, open to all, with free theme and no age restrictions. Its goal is to promote the artists and their careers through an array of opportunities.

History 
The competition was organized for the first time in 2006 by Italian Cultural association MoCA (Modern Contemporary Art) from an idea of the Arte Laguna studio. The jury is international and is composed of museums and foundations directors, independent curators and art critics. Every year, the finalists of the various sections show their works at the Arsenale of Venice and in the exhibition spaces of the TIM Future Centre, also in Venice.

During its long years of activity, Arte Laguna Prize has proven to be attentive to the most current instances in the art world and beyond. The same categories of works that can nowadays be proposed have evolved over time, following the most contemporary trends and always including new forms of expression. The award is currently open to the following artistic categories: Painting, Sculpture and Installation, Photographic Art, Video Art and Short Films, Performance, Digital Art, Digital Graphics and Cartoons, Land Art, Urban Art and Street Art, Art Design.  

For the 2010 edition, the Arte Laguna Prize was awarded with the medal of the President of the Italian Republic Giorgio Napolitano as his "prize of representation".

Prizes

Institutional prizes 
The competition provides a number of institutional prizes for the various sections:
 Painting Prize
 Sculpture and Installation & Virtual Art Prize 
 Photographic Art & Digital Graphics Prize
 Video Art and Short Films & Performance Prize
 Land Art & Urban Art Prize

Special prizes 
Special prizes include the realization of solo exhibitions in international galleries ("Artist in Gallery" Prizes), Art residencies for different periods in international locations, with the realization of on-site exhibitions and specific artworks ("Artist in Residence" Prizes). Over the various editions, other non-recurring special prizes were also awarded.

Other prizes 
The "Business for art" Prizes are dedicated to artistic projects related to production of industrial or craft items. These prizes include the collaboration of artists with prestigious Made in Italy companies, and the implementation of product-specific projects.

Concerning the attention given to current issues of general interest, worthy of mention are those Special Prizes related to environmental matters such as the ‘Art and Sustainability’ prize, dedicated to works, products or artistic projects that emphasise RRR (Reuse, Reduce, Recycle) strategies and their positive impact on nature and the lives of citizens, and the BigCi environmental residency that takes place in Australia in Wollemi National Park.

Editions

2022-2023 Edition 

Patronage: Ministry of Foreign Affairs, the Ministry of Culture, the Ministry of the Environment and Protection of Land and Sea, the Veneto Region, the Metropolitan City of Venice, the Municipality of Venice, the Cà Foscari University of Venice and the European Institute of Design.
 Prize Sections: Painting, Photographic Art, Sculpture and Installation, Video Art, Performance, Digital Art, Digital Graphics and Cartoon, Land Art, Urban Art, Art Design.
 Jury: Mohamed Benhadj; Raphael Chikukwa; Giulia Colletti; Paul Di Felice; Chloe Hodge; Dick Spierenburg; Xiaoyu Weng;
 Special Prizes: "Artist in Residence" Prizes (BigCi, Espronceda, Farm Cultural Park, Fabrica, Fonderia Artistica Versiliese), "Artist in Gallery" Prize (Cris Contini Gallery), "Sustainability & Art" (ARS - Art Reuse Sustainability), "Business for Art" Prize (Roberto Cipresso Special Prize, PLANIUM metal-metamorphosis collection, Generali, VENPA S.p.A, Informatic All); "Festivals and Exhibitions" (Art Nova 100, BJCEM - Mediterranea 20 - Young Artists Biennale); "Emerging Artist Award".
 Collective Exhibition: Arsenale of Venice, March 11 - April 16, 2023

2021-2022 Edition 

Patronage: Ministry of Foreign Affairs, the Ministry of Culture, the Ministry of the Environment and Protection of Land and Sea, the Veneto Region, the Metropolitan City of Venice, the Municipality of Venice, the Cà Foscari University of Venice and the European Institute of Design.
 Prize Sections: Painting, Photographic Art, Sculpture and Installation, Video Art, Performance, Digital Art, Digital Graphics and Cartoon, Land Art, Urban Art, Art Design.
 Jury: Kobi Ben-Meir; Louise Fedotov-Clements; Pasquale Lettieri; Alka Pande; Danilo Premoli; Alisa Prudnikova;
 Special Prizes: "Artist in Residence" Prizes (Espronceda, KW Institute, RU Residency Unlimited, Art Residency Galliani, Fonderia Artistica Versiliese, Villa Roberti, Villa San Liberale, Villa Rechsteiner), "Artist in Gallery" Prize (Cris Contini Gallery), "Sustainability & Art" (NaturaSì), "Business for Art" Prize (Bios Line); "Festivals and Exhibitions" (Art Nova 100)
 Collective Exhibition: Arsenale of Venice, March 11 - April 16, 2023

2020-2021 Edition 

 Patronage: Ministry of Foreign Affairs, the Ministry of Cultural Heritage, the Veneto Region, the Municipality of Venice, the Ca' Foscari University of Venice, the European Institute of Design.
 Prize Sections: Painting, Photographic Art, Sculpture and Installation, Video Art and Short Films, Performance, Digital Graphics and Cartoon, Digital Art, Land Art, Urban Art, Art Design.
 Jury: Bénédicte Alliot, Nathalie Angles, Lorenzo Balbi, Marcus Fairs, Matteo Galbiati, Sophie Goltz, Toshiyuki Kita, Beate Reifenscheid.
 Special Prizes: "Artist in Residence" Prizes (Fabrica, Espronceda, Basu Foundation for the Arts, Farm Cultural Park, Labverde), "Artist in Gallery" Prizes (Galerie Isabelle Lesmeister, Jonathan Ferrara Gallery, Arles Gallery, Capsule Gallery, Ki Smith Gallery), "Festival and Exhibitions" Prizes (Al-Tiba9, Art Nova 100, Art Stays Festival), "Business For Art" Prizes (Agnese Design), "Sustainability and Art" Prize: ARS (Art Reuse Sustainability) with Ca' Foscari University and Contarina Spa.
 Collective Exhibition: Arsenale Nord of Venice, October 2 - 24, 2021

2019-2020 Edition 

 Patronage: Ministry of Foreign Affairs, the Ministry of Cultural Heritage, the Veneto Region, the Municipality of Venice, the Ca' Foscari University of Venice, the European Institute of Design.
 Prize Sections: Painting, Sculpture and Installation and Virtual Art, Photographic Art and Digital Graphics, Video Art and Short Films and Performance, Environmental Art / Land Art and Urban Art, Art Design.
 Jury: Igor Zanti, Iwona Blazwick, Karel Boonzaaijer, Valentino Catricalà, Aldo Cibic, Erin Dziedzic, Zhao Li, Riccardo Passoni, Vasili Tsereteli.
 Special Prizes: "Artist in Residence" Prizes (Fabrica, Gridchinhall Gallery and Art Residency, Espronceda, Basu Foundation for the Arts, Farm Cultural Park, Maradiva Cultural Residency), "Artist in Gallery" Prizes (Galerie Isabelle Lesmeister, Jonathan Ferrara Gallery), "Festival and Exhibitions" Prizes (MMOMA Moscow Museum of Modern Art, Art Nova 100, Art Stays Festival), "Business For Art" Prizes (Majer, Outofblue), "Sustainability and Art" Prize: ARS (Art Reuse Sustainability) of aluminium (with (Ca' Foscari University and CIAL)
 Collective Exhibition: Arsenale Nord of Venice, October 2 - 24, 2021
 Winners: 
 Painting and Photographic Art: Belén Mazuecos, Spain
 Sculpture and Installation, Land Art, Urban Art:  Moshe Vollach, Israel
 Video Art, Digital graphics, Performance, Virtual Art: Gao Yuan, China
 Design: Primoz Jeza, Slovenia

2018-2019 Edition 

 Patronage: Ministry of Foreign Affairs, the Ministry of Cultural Heritage, the Veneto Region, the Municipality of Venice, the Ca' Foscari University of Venice, the European Institute of Design.
 Prize Sections: Painting, Sculpture and Installation and Virtual Art, Photographic Art and Digital Graphics, Video Art and Short Films and Performance, Environmental Art / Land Art and Urban Art, Design (with the support of Antrax).
 Jury: Igor Zanti, Filippo Andreatta, Flavio Arensi, Alfonso Femia, Mattias Givell, Eva Gonzàlez-Sancho, Richard Noyce, Simone Pallotta, Danilo Premoli, Enrico Stefanelli, Alessandra Tiddia, Vasili Tsereteli, Maxa Zoller.
 Special Prizes: "Artist in Residence" Prizes (Open Dream, Lanificio Paoletti, GLO'ART, Espronceda, Basu Foundation for the Arts, Farm Cultural Park, Maradiva Cultural Residency, Centrale Fies, Nuart Festival), "Artist in Gallery" Prizes (Galerie Isabelle Lesmeister, Vàrfok Galéria, Anise Gallery, Jonathan Ferrara Gallery), "Festival and Exhibitions" Prizes (Art Nova 100, Art Stays Festival, TraVellArt di Arte Communications, Photolux Festival), "Business For Art" Prizes (Fraccaro Spumadoro, Tessitura Luigi Bevilacqua, 47 Anno Domini, Maglificio Giordano's), "Sustainability and Art" Prize: ARS (Art Reuse Sustainability) of plastic (with (Ca' Foscari University and COREPLA), "Art Platform & Supporters" Prizes (The Art Spirit Foundation, Biafarin).
 Collective Exhibition: Arsenale of Venice from March 30 to April 25, 2019, 120 finalists.
 Winners: 
 Painting: Ryszard Szozda, Poland
 Sculpture and Installation and Virtual Art:  Jean-Philippe Côté, Canada
 Photographic Art and Digital Graphics: Silvia Montevecchi, Italy
 Video Art and Performance: Ginevra Panzetti and Enrico Ticconi, Italy
 Land Art and Urban Art: Jad El Khoury, Lebanon
 Design: Elena Colombo, Italy

2017-2018 Edition 
 Patronage: Ministero per i Beni e le Attività Culturali, Ministero degli Affari Esteri, Regione del Veneto, Comune di Venezia, Città Metropolitana di Venezia, IED Istituto Europeo di Design, Università Cà Foscari di Venezia, Camera di Commercio di Venezia.
 Prize Sections: Painting, Sculpture and Installation and Virtual Art, Photographic Art and Digital Graphics, Video Art and Short Films and Performance, Environmental Art / Land Art and Urban Art
 Jury: Igor Zanti, Domenico De Chirico, Caroline Corbetta, Denis Curti, Nicolangelo Gelormini, Emanuele Montibeller, Simone Pallotta, Nadim Samman, Manuel Segade, Ekaterina Shcherbakova, Eva Wittocx.
 Special Prizes: "Artist in Residence" Prizes (Arte Sella, Farm Cultural Park, The Swatch Art Peace Hotel, Murano Glass ArtResidency, Maradiva Cultural Residency, Basu Foundation for the Arts, GLO’ART, Espronceda, Serigrafia Artistica Fallani,  San Francisco Art Residency, The Art Department - Casa dell’Arte International Artists' Residency), "Artist in Gallery" Prizes (Galerie Isabelle Lesmeister, Galeria Fernando Santos, Chelouche Gallery for Contemporary Art),  "Festival ed Esposizioni" Prizes (Art Nova 100, Art Stays Festival, Open - Sculptures and installations Exhibition), "Business For Art" Prizes (Biafarin, Manifattura Zanetto, Artmajeur), "Sustainability and Art" Prize: ARS (Art Reuse Sustainability) of glass (Università Ca'Foscari, CoReVe).
 Collective Exhibition: Arsenale of Venice and Tim Future Center from March 17 to April 8, 2018, 115 finalists.
 Winners: 
 Painting: Alessandro Fogo, Italy
 Sculpture and Installation and Virtual Art: Yukawa-Nakayasu, Japan
 Photographic Art and Digital Graphics: Rojo Sache, Spain
 Video Art and Performance: Paula Tyliszczak, Poland
 Land Art and Urban Art: Gonzalo Borondo, Spain

2016-2017 Edition 
 Patronage: Ministero per i Beni e le Attività Culturali, Ministero degli Affari Esteri, Regione del Veneto, Comune di Venezia, Provincia di Venezia, IED Istituto Europeo di Design, IUAV di Venezia, Università Cà Foscari di Venezia, Fondazione Musei Civici di Venezia, Camera di Commercio di Venezia, Provincia di Treviso, Ascom Treviso
 Prize Sections: Painting, Sculpture and Installation, Photographic Art, Video Art and Performance, Virtual Art and Digital Graphics, Environmental Art / Land Art
 Jury: Igor Zanti, Flavio Arens, Manuel Borja-Villel, Tamara Chalabi, Paolo Colombo, Suad Garayeva, Ilaria Gianni, Nav Haq, Emanuele Montibeller, Fatoş Üstek, Alma Zevi.
 Special Prizes: "Artist in Residence" Prizes (San Francisco Art Residency, The Art Department - Casa dell’Arte International Artists' Residency, GLO’ART, Taipei Artist Village, Fondazione Berengo, Espronceda, Basu Foundation for the Arts, Serigrafia Artistica Fallani, Salvadori Arte - Fonderia artistica), "Artist in Gallery" Prizes (Salamatina Gallery, Galerie Isabelle Lesmeister, Galeria Fernando Santos, ART re.FLEX Gallery, Chelouche Gallery for Contemporary Art),  "Festival ed Esposizioni" Prizes (Art Nova 100, Art Stays Festival, Open - Sculptures and installations Exhibition), "Business For Art" Prizes (Rima Sofa & Beds, Papillover art collection, Eurosystem, Deglupta, Biafarin), "Sustainability and Art" Prize:  Paper RRR (Reuse Recycle Reduce) as Art and Design (Università Ca'Foscari, Comieco)
 Collective Exhibition: Arsenale of Venice and Tim Future Center from March 25 to April 9, 2017, 125 finalists.
 Winners: 
 Painting: Elías Peña Salvador, Spagna
 Sculpture and Installation: Elena Bertuzzi & Laure Chatrefou, Italia & Francia
 Photographic Art: María Gabriela Chirinos, Venezuela
 Video Art and Performance: Eliza Soroga, Grecia
 Virtual and Digital Art: Hill Kobayashi, Giappone
 Land Art: Branko Stanojević & Milena Strahinović, Serbia

2015-2016 Edition 
 Patronage: Ministero per i Beni e le Attività Culturali, Ministero degli Esteri, Regione del Veneto, Comune di Venezia, Provincia di Venezia, IED Istituto Europeo di Design, IUAV Venice, Cà Foscari University Venice, Fondazione Musei Civici Venice, Camera di Commercio Venice, Provincia di Treviso, Ascom Treviso
 Prize Sections: Painting, Sculpture and Installation, Photographic Art, Video Art and Performance, Virtual and Digital Art, Land Art
 Jury: Igor Zanti, Miguel Amado, Anna Bernardini, Barbara Boninsegna, Denis Curti, Enrico Fontanari, Suad Garayeva, Vasili Tsereteli, Sabrina Van der Ley, Simone Verde, Bettina von Dziembowski
 Special Prizes: Special Prizes Artist in Residence (Basu Foundations for the Arts, Artistic Serigraphy Fallani, Artistic Foundry Battaglia, Espronceda, Berengo Foundation, Taipei Artist Village, The Swatch Art Peace Hotel), Special Prize Open – Venice, Art Nova 100 - Beijing, Art Stays Festival - Slovenia; Special Prizes Artist in Gallery (Gaia Gallery, Istanbul; Galerie Isabelle Lesmeister, Regensburg; Galeria Fernando Santos, Porto; ART re.FLEX Gallery, Saint Petersburg).
 Business For Art Prizes: Riva 1920, Pas de Rouge, La Tordera
 Collective Exhibition: Arsenale of Venice, from March 19 to April 3, 2016, 120 finalist artists.
 Winners:
 Painting: Alexander Dashevskiy, Russia
 Sculpture and Installation: Farid Rasulov, Azerbaijan
 Photographic Art: Thomas Friedrich Schäfer, Germany
 Video Art and Performance: Ian Wolter, United Kingdom
 Virtual and Digital Art: Nicolas Maigret, France
 Land Art: Elise Eeraerts, Belgium

2014-2015 Edition 
 Patronage: Ministero per i Beni e le Attività Culturali, Ministero degli Esteri, Regione del Veneto, Comune di Venezia, Provincia di Venezia, IED Istituto Europeo di Design, IUAV Venice, Cà Foscari University Venice, Fondazione Musei Civici Venice, Camera di Commercio Venice, Provincia di Treviso, Ascom Treviso
 Prize Sections: Painting, Sculpture and Installation, Photographic Art, Video Art and Performance, Virtual and Digital Art, Land Art
 Jury: Igor Zanti, Claudio Bertorelli, Simone Frangi, Franck Gautherot, Chus Martinez, Bartolomeo Pietromarchi, Domenico Quaranta, Veeranganakumari Solanki, Philippe Van Cauteren, Jonathan Watkins, Roberto Zancan 
 Special Prizes: Special Prizes Artist in Residence (Basu Foundation for the Arts, Artistic Serigraphy Fallani, Artistic Foundry Battaglia, Glass School Abate Zanetti, Art Stays), Special Prize Open – Venice, Art Nova 100 - Beijing
 Business For Art Prizes: Riva 1920, Pas de Rouge, La Tordera
 Collective Exhibition: Arsenale of Venice, from March 21 to April 5, 2015, 120 finalist artists.
 Winners:
 Painting: Noemi Staniszewska, Poland
 Sculpture and Installation: Christine Kettaneh, Lebanon
 Photographic Art: Christopher Sims, United States
 Video Art and Performance: Gilles Fontolliet, Switzerland
 Virtual and Digital Art: Roberto Fassone, Italy
 Land Art: Andrew Friend, United Kingdom

2013-2014 Edition 
 Patronage: Ministero per i Beni e le Attività Culturali, Ministero degli Esteri, Regione del Veneto, Comune di Venezia, Provincia di Venezia, IED Istituto Europeo di Design, IUAV Venice, Cà Foscari University Venice.
 Prize Sections: Painting, Sculpture and Installation, Photographic Art, Video Art and Performance, Virtual and Digital Art.
 Jury: Igor Zanti, Enrico Bettinello, Silvia Ferri de Lazara, Victoria Lu, Domenico Quaranta, Veeranganakumari Solanki, Miguel Amado, Sabrina Van Der Ley, Andrea Viliani, Jonathan Watkins, Claudia Zanfi. 
 Special Prizes: Special Prizes Artist in Residence (Loft Miramarmi, Artistic Foundry Battaglia, India ARTresidency in collaboration with Technymon, Norimberga ARTresidency, Glass School Abate Zanetti, Art Stays), Special Prize Open – Venice, Art Nova 100 - Beijing, Innovative Interactive Tour on Telecom Italia Future Centre - Venice.
 Business For Art Prize: Riva 1920
 Collective Exhibition: Arsenale of Venice, from March 22 to April 6, 2014, 110 finalist artists.
 Winners:
 Painting: Bianca De Gier, The Netherlands
 Sculpture and Installation: Elaine Byrne, Ireland
 Photographic Art: Victoria Campillo, Spain
 Video Art and Performance: Apiyo Amolo, Kenya
 Virtuale and Digital Art: Émilie Brout & Maxime Marion, France

2012-2013 Edition 
 Patronage: Ministero per i Beni e le Attività Culturali, Regione del Veneto, Comune di Venezia, Provincia di Venezia, Istituto Europeo di Design, IUAV di Venezia, Università Ca' Foscari di Venezia.
 Prize Sections: Painting, Sculpture and Installation, Photographic Art, Video Art and Performance, Virtual Art-iFope.
 Jury: Umberto Angelini, Gabriella Belli, Gabriella Belli, Adam Budak, Cecilia Freschini, Mario Gerosa, Kanchi Mehta, Sabine Schaschl, Felix Schöber, Claudia Zanfi, Igor Zanti.
 Special Prizes: Special Prizes Artist in Residence (Technymon India ARTresidency, Loft Miramarmi, Glass School Abate Zanetti, Art Stays, Beijing Art Residency in collaboration with Lab-Yit, iaab), Special Prize Open – Internazional Exhibition of Sculptures and Installations, Venice.
 Business For Art Prize: FOPE Gioielli
 Collective Exhibition: Arsenale of Venice, from March 16 to March 31, 2013, 110 finalist artists.
 Winners:	
 Painting: Ivelisse Jimenez
 Sculpture and Installation: Costantine Zlatev
 Photographic Art: Richard Ansett
 Video Art and Performance: Carlos Martiel
 Virtual Art: Zer Nirit

2011-2012 Edition 
 Patronage: Ministero degli Affari Esteri, Provincia di Treviso, Comune di Venezia, Municipalità di Venezia, ASCOM Treviso.
 Prize Sections: Painting, Sculpture, Photographic Art, Video Art and Performance, Virtual Art.
 Jury Institutional Prizes: Alessio Antoniolli, Chiara Barbieri, Gabriella Belli, Ilaria Bonacossa, Soledad Gutierrez, Kanchi Mehta, Ludovico Pratesi, Maria Savarese, Ralf Schmitt, Alma Zevi, Igor Zanti.
 Special Prizes: Special Prizes Artist in Residence (Technymon India ARTresidency, Loft Miramarmi, Glass School Abate Zanetti, Art Stays, Carlo Zauli Museum, iaab), Special Prize "Tina b.", Special Prize "Open Arte Communication", Personal Exhibitions in a network of 27 galleries.
 Business For Art Prize: Special Prize "STILE Original Design"
 Collective Exhibition: Arsenale of Venice, from March 17 to April 1, 2012, 110 finalist artists.
 Winners:
 Painting: Cristina Gardumi
 Sculpture: Simone Bubbico
 Photographic Art: Torsten Schumann
 Video Art and Performance: Luis Bezeta
 Virtual Art: Amelia Zhang

2010-2011 Edition 
 Patronage: Ministero degli Affari Esteri, Regione del Veneto, Istituto Europeo di Design.
 Prize Sections: Painting, Sculpture, Photographic Art, Video Art, Performance.
 Jury Institutional Prizes: Chiara Barbieri, Rossella Bertolazzi, Monika Burian, Gianfranco Maraniello, Luca Panaro, Ludovico Pratesi, Maja Skerbot, Valentina Tanni, Matteo Zauli, Kristian Jarmuschek, Igor Zanti.
 Special Prizes: Special Prizes Artist in Residence (Glass School Abate Zanetti, Claudio Buziol Foundation, Carlo Zauli Museum, Art Stays), Special Prize "Tina b.", Special Prize "Open Arte Communication", Special Prize "Press Room", Personal Exhibitions in a network of 34 galleries.
 Business For Art Prize: "ReiL"
 Collective Exhibition: Arsenale of Venice, from March 12 to March 22, 2011, 180 finalist artists.
 Winners:	
 Painting: Miazbrothers
 Sculpture: Daniele Geminiani
 Photographic Art: Lottie Davies
 Video Art: IOCOSE
 Performing Arts: La Badini collettivo perforante

2009 Edition 
 Patronage: Ministero degli Affari Esteri, Regione del Veneto, Istituto Europeo di Design.
 Prize Sections: Painting, Sculpture, Photographic Art.
 Jury Institutional Prizes: Igor Zanti, Rossella Bertolazzi, Viviana Siviero, Alessandro Trabucco, Stefano Coletto; Lorenzo Respi.
 Special Prizes: Special Prize "Catch by the Eye, Save in the Heart 2010", London; Collective Exhibition at the Italian Cultural Institutes in Vienna and Prague; Personal Exhibitions in a network of 19 galleries.
 Business For Art Prize: "Art Collection Tenuta S. Anna"
 Collective Exhibition: Arsenale of Venice, from March 6 to March 27, 2010, 180 finalist artists.
 Winners:
 Painting: Sergio Padovani
 Sculpture: Olga Schigal
 Photographic Art: Dean West

2008 Edition 
 Patronage: Provincia di Treviso, Provincia di Venezia, Regione del Veneto, Istituto Europeo di Design
 Prize Sections: Painting, Sculpture, Photographic Art
 Jury Institutional Prizes: Igor Zanti, Annalisa Rosso, Carlo Sala, Viviana Siviero, Gloria Vallese Rossella Bertolazzi, Marcello Carriero, Laurent Fabry, Ilaria Piccioni, Giovanni Bianchi, Ilaria Simeoni
 Special Prizes: Special Prize "Inside Art", Special Prize "Radio Imago", Special Prize Seroxcult.com, Special Prize "Photosapiens.com", Special Prize "Virtual Jury", Personal Exhibitions in a network of 12 galleries.
 Business For Art Prize: "Capo d'Opera"
 Collective Exhibition: Brolo Centro d'Arte e Cultura, Mogliano Veneto, 18 October - 2 November 2008 (30 painting finalists), Fondazione Benetton Studi e Ricerche, Treviso, 4–19 October 2008 (30 sculpture finalists), Exhibition Venue "In Paradiso", Giardini della Biennale di Venezia, 22 October - 2 November 2008 (30 photographic art finalists).
 Winners: 	
 Painting: Pierluigi Febbraio
 Sculpture: Dania Zanotto
 Photographic Art: Paolo Angelosanto

2007 Edition 

 Patronage: Provincia di Treviso, Regione del Veneto, Accademia di Belle Arti di Venezia Venice
 Prize Sections: Painting, Photographic Art
 Jury Institutional Prizes: Michele Chiole (Chair of Jury), Corrado Cecconato, Emilio Lippi, Igor Zanti, Carlo Sala, Elisabetta Donaggio, Christine Poli, Ilaria Simeoni.
 Special Prizes: Special Prize "Galleria Polin", Special Prize "Wannabee Art Gallery", Special Prize "Galleria Paci Arte", Special Prize "3D Art Gallery", Special Prize "Virtual Jury".
 Collective Exhibition: Santa Caterina Museum, Treviso 7–28 September 2007, Palazzo Scotti, Treviso 19–31 October 2007, Traveling Exhibition, Mogliano Veneto, 10 November - 2 December 2007, Brolo Centro d'Arte e Cultura in Mogliano Veneto, 25 November - 2 December 2007, Galleria III Millennio, Venice 12–29 December 2007
 Winners:
 Painting: Michela Pedron
 Photographic Art: Michael Kai

2006 Edition 
 Patronage: Provincia di Treviso, Regione del Veneto, Accademia di Belle Arti di Venezia, Venice
 Prize Sections: Painting
 Jury Institutional Prizes: Rita Fazzello, Roberto Zamberlan, Corrado Castellani, Lucia Majer, Igor Zanti
 Special Prizes: Special Prize "Scent of woman"
 Collective Exhibition: Brolo Centro d'Arte e Cultura in Mogliano Veneto (Treviso)
 Winners: Laura Pozzar

See also

 List of European art awards

References

External links 
 Official website of the Arte Laguna Prize

Italian art awards